The 1974 Centennial Cup is the fourth Tier II Junior "A" 1974 ice hockey National Championship for the Canadian Junior A Hockey League.

The Centennial Cup was competed for by the winners of the Western Canadian Champions and the Eastern Canadian Champions.

The finals were hosted by the Selkirk Steelers in the city of Nepean, Ontario.

The Playoffs

Prior to Regionals
Wexford Raiders (OPJHL) defeated Windsor Spitfires (SOJHL) 4-games-to-3
Smiths Falls Bears (CJHL) defeated Lac Megantic Royals (QJAHL) 4-games-to-none
Charlottetown Islanders (IJHL) defeated Moncton Hawks (NBJHL) 3-games-to-2

MCC Finals

Regional Championships
Manitoba Centennial Cup: Selkirk Steelers

Abbott Cup: Selkirk Steelers
Eastern Champions: Smiths Falls Bears

Doyle Cup: Kelowna Buckaroos
Anavet Cup: Selkirk Steelers
Dudley Hewitt Cup:  Wexford Raiders
Callaghan Cup: Smiths Falls Bears

Roll of League Champions
AJHL: Red Deer Rustlers
BCJHL: Kelowna Buckaroos
CJHL: Smiths Falls Bears
IJHL: Charlottetown Colonels
MJHL: Selkirk Steelers
NBJHL: Moncton Hawks
NJAHL: Gander Jr. Flyers
OPJHL: Wexford Raiders
QJAHL: Lac Megantic Royals
SJHL: Prince Albert Raiders
SOJAHL: Windsor Spitfires
TBJHL: Thunder Bay Hurricanes

See also
Canadian Junior A Hockey League
Royal Bank Cup
Anavet Cup
Doyle Cup
Dudley Hewitt Cup
Fred Page Cup
Abbott Cup
Mowat Cup

External links
Royal Bank Cup Website

1990
Cup